Francisco "Paco" Javier González García (born 23 February 1988) is a Mexican footballer who plays as a midfielder.

Club career
González joined Toluca's youth in 2001, staying until 2012 whilst featuring for various sides of the club in the Mexican football league system. He first appeared for Toluca Premier in the third tier at the age of fifteen. From 2006, he played for their first-team in the Primera División, featuring in a defeat to San Luis on 13 September 2006. Across the 2006–07 campaign, González participated in five fixtures for Toluca. Also in that season, González featured for their reserves, Atlético Mexiquense of Primera División A, making his debut on 21 October 2006 against Real Colima. He scored versus Veracruz in September 2008.

In total, he scored one goal in thirty-eight appearances for Atlético Mexiquense, which were spread across three years. González departed the club on loan in 2010 to play for Altamira. Ten appearances followed in Liga de Ascenso. 2012 saw the midfielder leave permanently, subsequently joining Potros UAEM. He scored on both his first and final appearance for Potros UAEM, namely against Atlas B and Cruz Azul Jasso. In 2016, González moved to the United States for a trial with Major Arena Soccer League side Chicago Mustangs; subsequently signing a contract with Armando Gamboa's indoor soccer team.

International career
González represented the Mexico U20s early in his career.

Career statistics
.

References

External links

Francisco González on chicagomustangspro.com

1988 births
Living people
People from Atlacomulco
Mexican footballers
Mexico youth international footballers
Mexico under-20 international footballers
Indoor soccer players
Association football midfielders
Liga Premier de México players
Ascenso MX players
Liga MX players
Major Arena Soccer League players
Deportivo Toluca F.C. Premier players
Atlético Mexiquense footballers
Deportivo Toluca F.C. players
Altamira F.C. players
Potros UAEM footballers
Chicago Mustangs (2012–) players